James "Jim" Pierce (born  in Greenville, South Carolina) is an American wheelchair curler.

He participated in the 2006 and 2010 where the American team finished in seventh and fourth places respectively.

Teams

References

External links 

Profile at the Official Website for the 2010 Winter Paralympics in Vancouver

Living people
1963 births
Sportspeople from Greenville, South Carolina
American male curlers
American wheelchair curlers
American disabled sportspeople
Paralympic wheelchair curlers of the United States
Wheelchair curlers at the 2006 Winter Paralympics
Wheelchair curlers at the 2010 Winter Paralympics